A pickleback is a type of shot wherein a shot of liquor is chased by a shot of pickle brine; the term “pickleback” may also refer only to the shot of pickle brine itself. Alternatively, the shot can be chased by a bite of a pickle (generally, a whole dill pickle). The pickle brine works to neutralize both the taste of the liquor and the burn of the alcohol.

International spread
The "pickleback" has spread internationally, particularly in the English-speaking world, with many bars now offering picklebacks on their menus. The drink has had significant success in Aberdeen, Scotland, thanks to its reputed popularity among staff of the craft brewer BrewDog whose flagship bar is in the city. This has resulted in city establishment "The Tippling House" having to increase their nightly supply of pickle brine to ensure that the drink can stay available.

British visitors returning to the United Kingdom from New York City (thanks to Vincent Leclerc from Montreal, who introduced the pickleback in NYC in 2009) introduced the recipe to bars in both London (as early as 2011), and Devon. In 2012, UK bartender Byron Knight created a bottled pickleback using his own homegrown dill pickles and a flavour profile of ginger, mustard seeds, dill, garlic and dark sugar.

The drink has also spread to Canada, Shanghai, Belfast and New Zealand.

References

External links 

 

Shooters (drinks)
Pickles
Whisky